The 1917 San Salvador earthquake occurred on June 7 at 18:55 local time near the Salvadoran capital. The earthquake caused significant destruction of the city and left approximately 1,050 dead. It was followed by an eruption on San Salvador that killed another 1,100. Only behind the earthquake of 1986, it is the second deadliest in El Salvador's history.

Earthquake
El Salvador lies atop the Chortis Block, near its western margin. It is bounded by the Motagua–Polochic Fault between the North American–Caribbean transform boundary. Along the western margin, at the Middle America Trench, the Cocos Plate subducts beneath it at /year. Subduction produces volcanism along the Central America Volcanic Arc (CAVA) which stretches from Costa Rica to Guatemala. Within the shallow crust of El Salvador, seismicity is associated with the El Salvador Fault Zone (ESFZ), a shear zone. The ESFZ consists of strike-slip and normal faults which have produced large destructive earthquakes in 1917, 1919, 1965 and 2001. One of these faults, the Guaycume Fault, may have been the source of the earthquake. A slip rate of /yr was suggested along the fault, one of the most dangerous in El Salvador due to its closeness to San Salvador. Another possible source is a fault running beneath the San Salvador volcano that ruptured. The earthquake measured a moment magnitude of 6.7  and surface-wave magnitude of 6.5 . About 30 minutes later, a 6.3  earthquake struck nearby, beneath the San Salvador volcano. An aftershock of 6.0  occurred in 1919.

Impact

The Colombian poet, Porfirio Barba-Jacob, recorded a total of 1,050 fatalities and many injured. In the towns of Armenia and Quezaltepeque, 40 people were killed and over 100 were injured. Damage in San Salvador was severe; described as "80 out of every 100 homes were razed". The business district of San Salvador was incinerated by fires. The large fires killed an estimated 100 people. Residents failed to douse the flames as the city's water systems were wrecked. Out of the 9,000 homes in San Salvador, only 200 remained standing. All government buildings with the exception of the national theater and palace withstood the earthquake. Hospitals, university buildings, schools, and other public structures were razed. The town of Santa Tecla and other nearby communities were levelled. Surviving buildings eventually toppled during the second major earthquake at 19:30. In addition to damaged buildings, the local coffee plantations were ruined.

San Salvador eruption
The San Salvador volcano erupted about 35 minutes after the 6.3  earthquake. A fissure was observed at 20:11 along the volcanic slope. Smoke bellowed from the fissure and lava was seen. An ash cloud was produced and accompanied by an -long lava flow along the northern slopes. An estimated  of lava and scoria was ejected. The eruption was the largest since 1671, but was still considered small in size. It may have been triggered by the earthquakes disrupting plumbing within the magma chamber. The lava flows destroyed homes and buried the railway tracks between Quezaltepeque and Sitio del Niño. The site of the eruption and its lava flows are known as Los Chintos. Approximately 1,100 people were killed, including 500 who perished when they were caught in the lava flows. At least 200 people died from the pyroclastic flows while a further 100 died from lahars. On 10 June, 300 residents were killed by another lava flow. The eruption rated a 3 on the Volcanic explosivity index.

Aftermath
The book El terremoto de San Salvador: narración de un superviviente (The San Salvador Earthquake: A Survivor's Narrative) written by Porfirio Barba-Jacob documents the events of 1917.

See also

 List of earthquakes in 1917
 List of earthquakes in El Salvador

References

Further reading

1917 earthquakes
Earthquakes in El Salvador
1917 in El Salvador
June 1917 events
VEI-3 eruptions
20th-century volcanic events
La Libertad Department (El Salvador)
History of San Salvador
Events in San Salvador